West End Historic District is a national historic district located at Suffolk, Virginia. The district encompasses 201 contributing buildings and 93 contributing structures in a primarily residential section of the city of Suffolk.  The district includes buildings dating from the last decade of the 19th century through the first four decades of the 20th century in a variety of popular architectural styles including Queen Anne and Folk Victorian. The residences were developed to support the growing upper-, middle-, and working-class populations. Notable buildings include the J. C. Causey, Jr. House, Oxford United Methodist Church (1922), and West End Baptist Church (1938).

It was added to the National Register of Historic Places in 2003, with a boundary increase in 2004.

References

Historic districts on the National Register of Historic Places in Virginia
Queen Anne architecture in Virginia
Victorian architecture in Virginia
Buildings and structures in Suffolk, Virginia
National Register of Historic Places in Suffolk, Virginia